Anadenanthera colubrina var. cebil is a mimosa-like timber tree native to Caatinga and Cerrado vegetation in Argentina, Bolivia, Brazil, Paraguay and Peru. It has also been introduced to Mauritius. The flowers are cream-colored and arrive in the spring. The seed pods are fairly straight and contain about 8 to 15 seeds each.

Uses

Gum
Gum from the tree can be used in the same way as gum arabic.

Honey
This tree is used as a honey plant.

Medicine
The tree is a medicinal plant.  The bark is the most-used part of the tree for this.  Small amounts of roasted, powdered seeds are snuffed for headaches and colds.

Ornamental tree
The tree is an ornamental plant, and it is especially useful as an urban tree.

Tannin
The tree's bark contains about 15.38% tannin.  The seed pods contain 3% tannin and the heartwood contains 1.8%.

Wood
The wood is very hard and it dulls cutting tools.  The heartwood is quite durable.  The tree's wood is used for outdoor construction, marine applications, railroad ties and implement handles.

Alkaloids
Bufotenin and dimethyltryptamine have been isolated from the seeds and seed pods, 5-MeO-DMT from the bark of the stems.

Conservation
A. colubrina var. cebil is very much sought for its wood and bark (for medicinal purposes) and so it is being destructively cut down by industry.  Since the tree is beautiful and useful, calls are being made to plant trees near communities that use them, so that sustainable harvesting of the tree can be accomplished.

Propagation
The seeds can be placed between a folded damp paper towel in a sealable plastic sandwich bag for a few days until the seeds sprout. Once watered, it is important to let the growing medium dry out well, before watering again.

See also
Anadenanthera colubrina
List of honey plants
List of plants of Caatinga vegetation of Brazil
List of plants of Cerrado vegetation of Brazil

References

External links
Anandenanthera macrocarpa Click on Image (www.fieldmuseum.org)
Anadenanthera colubrina var. cebil (ILDIS)
 Anadenanthera macrocarpa
 Anadenanthera colubrina var. cebil Photo
Current Specimen List for Anadenanthera colubrina var. cebil

colubrina var. cebil
Trees of Argentina
Trees of Bolivia
Trees of Brazil
Trees of Paraguay
Trees of Peru
Medicinal plants of South America

pt:Anadenanthera macrocarpa